Chisholm is a census-designated place (CDP) in the town of Jay in Franklin County, Maine, United States. The population was 1,380 at the 2010 census. It is an industrial village named for Hugh J. Chisholm, who built the Otis Falls Pulp & Paper Company here in 1888 to use Androscoggin River water power.

Geography

Chisholm is located along the southern edge of the town of Jay at  (44.486532, -70.195040). It is bordered to the south by the town of Livermore Falls in Androscoggin and is contiguous with that town's urban core.

It is located on the east side of the Androscoggin River.

Demographics

As of the census of 2000, there were 1,399 people, 633 households, and 405 families residing in the CDP. The racial makeup of the CDP was 98.36% White, 0.36% African American, 0.36% Native American, 0.21% Asian, 0.36% from other races, and 0.36% from two or more races. Hispanic or Latino of any race were 1.00% of the population.

There were 633 households, out of which 24.0% had children under the age of 18 living with them, 48.2% were married couples living together, 12.0% had a female householder with no husband present, and 35.9% were non-families. 29.4% of all households were made up of individuals, and 15.3% had someone living alone who was 65 years of age or older. The average household size was 2.21 and the average family size was 2.69.

In the CDP, the population was spread out, with 20.8% under the age of 18, 8.0% from 18 to 24, 24.9% from 25 to 44, 25.7% from 45 to 64, and 20.6% who were 65 years of age or older. The median age was 43 years. For every 100 females, there were 90.1 males. For every 100 females age 18 and over, there were 85.3 males.

The median income for a household in the CDP was $35,500, and the median income for a family was $39,148. Males had a median income of $40,161 versus $23,438 for females. The per capita income for the CDP was $19,251. About 7.2% of families and 11.0% of the population were below the poverty line, including 17.4% of those under age 18 and 4.6% of those age 65 or over.

References

External links
 Town of Jay, Maine

Census-designated places in Maine
Company towns in Maine
Census-designated places in Franklin County, Maine
Populated places established in 1888
Jay, Maine